Mocan is a Romanian and Turkish surname. Notable people with the surname include:

 Liviu Mocan (born 1955), Romanian sculptor and poet
 Naci Mocan, Turkish-American economist and scholar

See also
 Mocan (disambiguation)
 Mocanu

Romanian-language surnames
Turkish-language surnames